Mariposa is the second album by Italian singer Lodovica Comello. It was released in Italy on February 3, 2015. The first single, "Todo el resto no cuenta", was released ahead of the album's release on January 30, 2015. The second single, "Sin usar palabras", was released on April 24, 2015.

Track listing

Charts

References 

2015 albums
Italian-language albums
Lodovica Comello albums
Pop rock albums by Italian artists
Sony Music albums
Spanish-language albums